Marquess of Oreja  is a hereditary  title of Spanish nobility. It was created on 8 April 2010 by King Juan Carlos I of Spain in favor of Marcelino Oreja, diplomat and politician.

Marquesses of Oreja (2010)
 Marcelino Oreja, 1st Marquess of Oreja (2010–)

References

Marquessates in the Spanish nobility
Noble titles created in 2010